Fury at Gunsight Pass is a 1956 American Western film directed by Fred F. Sears and starring David Brian, Neville Brand and Richard Long.

Plot
Bank robbers hold townspeople hostage, threatening to kill one of them every thirty minutes until $35,000 from an earlier robbery, hidden by a deceased accomplice, is found.

Cast
 David Brian as Whitney Turner
 Neville Brand as Dirk Hogan
 Richard Long as Roy Hanford
 Lisa Davis as Kathy Phillips
 Katharine Warren as Mrs. Boggs
 Percy Helton as Peter Boggs
 Morris Ankrum as Doc Phillips
 Addison Richards as Charles Hanford
 Joe Forte as Andrew Ferguson
 Wally Vernon as Okay, Okay
 Paul E. Burns as Squint
 Frank Fenton as Sheriff Meeker

External links
 

1956 films
American black-and-white films
1956 Western (genre) films
American Western (genre) films
Columbia Pictures films
Films directed by Fred F. Sears
1950s English-language films
1950s American films